Jyrki Blom (born 11 May 1962) is a retired Finnish javelin thrower. He finished fourth at the 1986 European Championships. He competed at the 1987 World Championships, but placed lowly in the qualification round and did not reach the final.

Achievements

Seasonal bests by year
1986 - 80.48
1987 - 79.28
1988 - 73.64
1989 - 76.78
1990 - 76.30
1992 - 77.00
1993 - 76.44

External links

1962 births
Living people
Finnish male javelin throwers